Haku (written:  or ) is a Japanese surname. Notable people with the surname include:

, Japanese politician
, better known as Kiyoko Arai, Japanese manga artist
, Japanese artist

Japanese-language surnames